or  is a fjord in the municipalities of Lavangen and Salangen in Troms og Finnmark county, Norway. The majority of the fjord is in Lavangen municipality (hence the name of the municipality). The village of Tennevoll lies at the end of the fjord and the village of Å lies on the northern shore.

See also
 List of Norwegian fjords

References

Fjords of Troms og Finnmark
Lavangen
Salangen